Salibacterium lacus is a Gram-positive, strictly aerobic, halophilic, non-spore-former and motile bacterium from the genus of Salibacterium which has been isolated from sediments from the Lake Yuncheng in China.

References

 

Bacillaceae
Bacteria described in 2018